Tenpin bowling is a popular and recreational sport in India. The activity is administered by the Bangalore-based Tenpin Bowling Federation of India. It organises the National Bowling League comprising championships for amateurs, corporate team tournaments as well as a national tour for professionals. Many Indians take up bowling for fitness, rather than for recreation. Bowling alleys in India are commonly a part of multiplexes and malls.

In Chennai, the sport was widely known as "snow bowling" in the late 1990s and early 2000s, owing to its presence in the 'Snow Bowling' Centre in Chennai. The term "snow bowling" has been referenced in songs such as "Dey Nandakumara" from Seenu (2000), "Oh Mama Mama" from Minnale (2001), "Sandhippoma" in Enakku 20 Unakku 18 (2003) and "Kannin Maniye" from Gambeeram (2004).

In 2008, the Indian team participated in the WTBA World Tenpin Bowling Championships in Bangkok and the Commonwealth Tenpin Bowling Championships in Belfast.

Mr. Rajmohan Palaniappan, first Indian to score a perfect game (300) in 40th Singapore Open in the Year 2007 ...

Total medals won by Indian Bowlers in Major tournaments

1) Commonwealth Tenpin Bowling Championships – 2002
   Mr. Shaik Abdu Hameed won 3 medals in this event…
   1) Gold Medal in Men’s Singles 2) Silver Medal in All Events 3) Gold Medal in Masters
2) Commonwealth Tenpin Bowling Championships – 2011
   1) Bronze Medal for Mixed Team (2 Men & 2 Women) 
   (Tamil Nadu Bowler Mr. Shabbir Dhankot was one of the team members)

Other Major Medals for India from Tenpin Bowling Championships

1) Asian Tenpin Bowling Championships – 2015
   1) Silver Medal for Men’s Singles (Tamil Nadu Bowler Mr. Shabbir Dhankot got the second medal for India)
2) Commonwealth Tenpin Bowling Championships – 2016
   1) Silver Medal for Men’s Singles (Mr. Akash Kumar, Karnatak Bowler)
3) Asian Indore & Martial Arts Games – 2017
   1)Bronze Medal for Doubles (Mr. Shabbir Dhankot, Tamil Nadu & Mr. Dhruv Sarad, Delhi)

References

 
Sport in India
Ten-pin bowling in India